Jeff Ball may refer to:

 Jeff Ball (baseball) (born 1969), former Major League Baseball first baseman
 Jeff Ball (flautist) (born 1966), Native American flute player